Comox was a provincial electoral district in the Canadian province of British Columbia.  It was one of the first twelve ridings representing that province upon its joining Confederation, and was a one-member constituency.  The core of this once-vast riding, which at its inception stretched to the Yukon border, is now named Comox Valley.

Demographics

Political geography 

Nominally this riding included most of the Central Coast as well as all of northern Vancouver Island, but in practicality there were very few eligible voters as the vast majority of the area's population was from one of the many First Nations in the district.

Notable elections

First Nations

Notable MLAs

Electoral history 

Note: Winners in each election are in bold.

|-

|Independent
|John Ash
|align="right"|16
|align="right"|66.67%
|align="right"|
|align="right"|unknown

|Independent
|Robert Cameron Coleman
|align="right"|8
|align="right"|33.33%
|align="right"|
|align="right"|unknown
|- bgcolor="white"
!align="right" colspan=3|Total valid votes
!align="right"|24
!align="right"|100.00%
!align="right"|
|- bgcolor="white"
!align="right" colspan=3|Total rejected ballots
!align="right"|
!align="right"|
!align="right"|
|- bgcolor="white"
!align="right" colspan=3|Turnout
!align="right"|%
!align="right"|
!align="right"|
|}

|-

|Independent
|John Ash
|align="right"|Acclaimed
|align="right"| -.- %
|align="right"|
|align="right"|unknown
|- bgcolor="white"
!align="right" colspan=3|Total valid votes
!align="right"|n/a
!align="right"| -.- %
!align="right"|
|- bgcolor="white"
!align="right" colspan=3|Total rejected ballots
!align="right"|
!align="right"|
!align="right"|
|- bgcolor="white"
!align="right" colspan=3|Turnout
!align="right"|%
!align="right"|
!align="right"|
|- bgcolor="white"
!align="right" colspan=7|1  The byelection was called due to J. Ash's resignation upon appointment to the Executive Council (cabinet) on December 23, 1872.  This byelection was one of a series held to confirm appointments to the Executive Council, which was the old parliamentary convention.  As this byelection writ was filled by acclamation, no polling day was required and the seat was filled within two weeks.  The stated date is the date the return of writs was received by the Chief Electoral Officer.
|}

|-

|- bgcolor="white"
!align="right" colspan=3|Total valid votes
!align="right"|46
!align="right"|100.00%
!align="right"|
|- bgcolor="white"
!align="right" colspan=3|Total rejected ballots
!align="right"|
!align="right"|
!align="right"|
|- bgcolor="white"
!align="right" colspan=3|Turnout
!align="right"|%
!align="right"|
!align="right"|
|}

|-

|- bgcolor="white"
!align="right" colspan=3|Total valid votes
!align="right"|52
!align="right"|100.00%
!align="right"|
|- bgcolor="white"
!align="right" colspan=3|Total rejected ballots
!align="right"|
!align="right"|
!align="right"|
|- bgcolor="white"
!align="right" colspan=3|Turnout
!align="right"|%
!align="right"|
!align="right"|
|}

|- bgcolor="white"
!align="right" colspan=3|Total valid votes
!align="right"|83
|- bgcolor="white"
!align="right" colspan=7|2  Withdrew before polling day.
|}

|-

|- bgcolor="white"
!align="right" colspan=3|Total valid votes
!align="right"|128
!align="right"|100.00%
!align="right"|
|- bgcolor="white"
!align="right" colspan=3|Total rejected ballots
!align="right"|
!align="right"|
!align="right"|
|- bgcolor="white"
!align="right" colspan=3|Turnout
!align="right"|%
!align="right"|
!align="right"|
|}

|-

|- bgcolor="white"
!align="right" colspan=3|Total valid votes
!align="right"|188
!align="right"|100.00%
!align="right"|
|- bgcolor="white"
!align="right" colspan=3|Total rejected ballots
!align="right"|
!align="right"|
!align="right"|
|- bgcolor="white"
!align="right" colspan=3|Turnout
!align="right"|%
!align="right"|
!align="right"|
|}

|-

|- bgcolor="white"
!align="right" colspan=3|Total valid votes
!align="right"|368
!align="right"|100.00%
!align="right"|
|- bgcolor="white"
!align="right" colspan=3|Total rejected ballots
!align="right"|
!align="right"|
!align="right"|
|- bgcolor="white"
!align="right" colspan=3|Turnout
!align="right"|%
!align="right"|
!align="right"|
|}

|-

|- bgcolor="white"
!align="right" colspan=3|Total valid votes
!align="right"|459
!align="right"|100.00%
!align="right"|
|- bgcolor="white"
!align="right" colspan=3|Total rejected ballots
!align="right"|
!align="right"|
!align="right"|
|- bgcolor="white"
!align="right" colspan=3|Turnout
!align="right"|%
!align="right"|
!align="right"|
|- bgcolor="white"
!align="right" colspan=7|3 Later 14th Premier of British Columbia 1900-1902
|}

|-

|- bgcolor="white"
!align="right" colspan=3|Total valid votes
!align="right"|617
!align="right"|100.00%
!align="right"|
|- bgcolor="white"
!align="right" colspan=3|Total rejected ballots
!align="right"|
!align="right"|
!align="right"|
|- bgcolor="white"
!align="right" colspan=3|Turnout
!align="right"|%
!align="right"|
!align="right"|
|- bgcolor="white"
!align="right" colspan=7|4  3. McPhee was nominated as a Liberal candidate in opposition to Mounce who campaigned as a Conservative Party supporter. According to the Nanaimo Herald both were anti-Martin but the Vancouver Province and Victoria Times listed both as Government.
|}

|-

|Liberal
|Frederick McBain Young
|align="right"|317
|align="right"|46.76%
|align="right"|
|align="right"|unknown
|- bgcolor="white"
!align="right" colspan=3|Total valid votes
!align="right"|678
!align="right"|100.00%
!align="right"|
|- bgcolor="white"
!align="right" colspan=3|Total rejected ballots
!align="right"|
!align="right"|
!align="right"|
|- bgcolor="white"
!align="right" colspan=3|Turnout
!align="right"|%
!align="right"|
!align="right"|
|}

|-
 
|Liberal
|John Bertram Bennett
|align="right"|292
|align="right"|43.98%
|align="right"|
|align="right"|unknown

|- bgcolor="white"
!align="right" colspan=3|Total valid votes
!align="right"|664
!align="right"|100.00%
!align="right"|
|- bgcolor="white"
!align="right" colspan=3|Total rejected ballots
!align="right"|
!align="right"|
!align="right"|
|- bgcolor="white"
!align="right" colspan=3|Turnout
!align="right"|%
!align="right"|
!align="right"|
|}

 
|Liberal
|James McKelvey Forrest
|align="right"|172
|align="right"|17.50%
|align="right"|
|align="right"|unknown

|- bgcolor="white"
!align="right" colspan=3|Total valid votes
!align="right"|983
!align="right"|100.00%
!align="right"|
|- bgcolor="white"
!align="right" colspan=3|Total rejected ballots
!align="right"|
!align="right"|
!align="right"|
|- bgcolor="white"
!align="right" colspan=3|Turnout
!align="right"|%
!align="right"|
!align="right"|
|}

|-

|- bgcolor="white"
!align="right" colspan=3|Total valid votes
!align="right"|1,049
!align="right"|100.00%
!align="right"|
|- bgcolor="white"
!align="right" colspan=3|Total rejected ballots
!align="right"|
!align="right"|
!align="right"|
|- bgcolor="white"
!align="right" colspan=3|Turnout
!align="right"|%
!align="right"|
!align="right"|
|}

|-

 
|Liberal
|Hugh Stewart 
|align="right"|916
|align="right"|43.07%
|align="right"|
|align="right"|unknown

|- bgcolor="white"
!align="right" colspan=3|Total valid votes
!align="right"|812
!align="right"|100.00%
!align="right"|
|- bgcolor="white"
!align="right" colspan=3|Total rejected ballots
!align="right"|
!align="right"|
!align="right"|
|- bgcolor="white"
!align="right" colspan=3|Turnout
!align="right"|%
!align="right"|
!align="right"|
|}

|-

 
|Peoples Party (Farmer-Labour)
|Thomas Menzies 
|align="right"|1,354
|align="right"|32.83%
|align="right"|
|align="right"|unknown
 
|Liberal
|Patrick Daly
|align="right"|806
|align="right"|19.54%
|align="right"|
|align="right"|unknown
|- bgcolor="white"
!align="right" colspan=3|Total valid votes
!align="right"|4,124
!align="right"|100.00%
!align="right"|
|- bgcolor="white"
!align="right" colspan=3|Total rejected ballots
!align="right"|
!align="right"|
!align="right"|
|- bgcolor="white"
!align="right" colspan=3|Turnout
!align="right"|%
!align="right"|
!align="right"|
|}

|-

|- bgcolor="white"
!align="right" colspan=3|Total valid votes
!align="right"|2,869
!align="right"|100.00%

|-
 
|Co-operative Commonwealth Fed.
|Harold Tuttle Allen
|align="right"|1,590
|align="right"|36.03%
|align="right"|
|align="right"|unknown

 
|Liberal
|Laurence Arnold Hanna 
|align="right"|2,204
|align="right"|49.94%
|align="right"|
|align="right"|unknown

|Independent
|Ernest Richard Tarling
|align="right"|84
|align="right"|1.90%
|align="right"|
|align="right"|unknown
|- bgcolor="white"
!align="right" colspan=3|Total valid votes
!align="right"|4,413
!align="right"|100.00%
!align="right"|
|- bgcolor="white"
!align="right" colspan=3|Total rejected ballots
!align="right"|34
!align="right"|
!align="right"|
|- bgcolor="white"
!align="right" colspan=3|Turnout
!align="right"|%
!align="right"|
!align="right"|
|}

|-
 
|Co-operative Commonwealth Fed.
|Colin Cameron 
|align="right"|2,336
|align="right"|44.83%
|align="right"|
|align="right"|unknown
 
|Liberal
|Laurence Arnold Hanna
|align="right"|1,876
|align="right"|36.00%
|align="right"|
|align="right"|unknown

|- bgcolor="white"
!align="right" colspan=3|Total valid votes
!align="right"|5,211
!align="right"|100.00%
!align="right"|
|- bgcolor="white"
!align="right" colspan=3|Total rejected ballots
!align="right"|80
!align="right"|
!align="right"|
|- bgcolor="white"
!align="right" colspan=3|Turnout
!align="right"|%
!align="right"|
!align="right"|
|}

|-
 
|Co-operative Commonwealth Fed.
|Colin Cameron 
|align="right"|3,126
|align="right"|45.31%
|align="right"|
|align="right"|unknown
 
|Liberal
|William Edward Mantle
|align="right"|2,158
|align="right"|31.28%
|align="right"|
|align="right"|unknown

|- bgcolor="white"
!align="right" colspan=3|Total valid votes
!align="right"|6,899
!align="right"|100.00%
!align="right"|
|- bgcolor="white"
!align="right" colspan=3|Total rejected ballots
!align="right"|166
!align="right"|
!align="right"|
|- bgcolor="white"
!align="right" colspan=3|Turnout
!align="right"|%
!align="right"|
!align="right"|
|}

|-
 
|Co-operative Commonwealth Fed.
|Colin Cameron 
|align="right"|3,362
|align="right"|44.69%
|align="right"|
|align="right"|unknown

|- bgcolor="white"
!align="right" colspan=3|Total valid votes
!align="right"|7,523
!align="right"|100.00%
!align="right"|
|- bgcolor="white"
!align="right" colspan=3|Total rejected ballots
!align="right"|161
!align="right"|
!align="right"|
|- bgcolor="white"
!align="right" colspan=3|Turnout
!align="right"|%
!align="right"|
!align="right"|
|}

|-
 
|Co-operative Commonwealth Fed.
|Colin Cameron 
|align="right"|5,238
|align="right"|40.81%
|align="right"|
|align="right"|unknown

|- bgcolor="white"
!align="right" colspan=3|Total valid votes
!align="right"|12,834 
!align="right"|100.00%
!align="right"|
|- bgcolor="white"
!align="right" colspan=3|Total rejected ballots
!align="right"|435
!align="right"|
!align="right"|
|- bgcolor="white"
!align="right" colspan=3|Turnout
!align="right"|%
!align="right"|
!align="right"|
|}

|-

|Progressive Conservative
|W. Bruce Gordon
|align="right"|1,868     
|align="right"|13.58%
|align="right"|--  
|align="right"|--.--%
|align="right"|
|align="right"|unknown

|Co-operative Commonwealth Fed.
|William Campbell Moore
|align="right"|5,369
|align="right"|39.03%
|align="right"|7,098
|align="right"|57.67%
|align="right"|
|align="right"|unknown

|Liberal
|Herbert John Welch
|align="right"|3,532            
|align="right"|25.68%  
|align="right"|5,210
|align="right"|42.33% 
|align="right"|
|align="right"|unknown
|- bgcolor="white"
!align="right" colspan=3|Total valid votes
!align="right"|13,756              
!align="right"|100.00%
!align="right"|12,308 
!align="right"|%
!align="right"|
|- bgcolor="white"
!align="right" colspan=3|Total rejected ballots
!align="right"|446
!align="right"|
!align="right"|
|- bgcolor="white"
!align="right" colspan=3|Turnout
!align="right"|77.94%
!align="right"|
!align="right"|
|- bgcolor="white"
!align="right" colspan=9|5(Preferential ballot: 1st and 3rd counts of three shown only) 	
|}

|-

|Liberal
|John Wesley Baikie
|align="right"|2,944 	 	
|align="right"|21.71%  
|align="right"|-
|align="right"|-.-% 
|align="right"|
|align="right"|unknown

|Co-operative Commonwealth Fed.
|William Campbell Moore
|align="right"|5,462
|align="right"|40.28%
|align="right"|6,717
|align="right"|53.83%
|align="right"|
|align="right"|unknown

|Progressive Conservative
|Nugent Watson Spinks
|align="right"|378 
|align="right"|2.79%
|align="right"|--  
|align="right"|--.--%
|align="right"|
|align="right"|unknown
|- bgcolor="white"
!align="right" colspan=3|Total valid votes
!align="right"|13,561 	  	       
!align="right"|100.00%
!align="right"|12,479 	 
!align="right"|%
!align="right"|
|- bgcolor="white"
!align="right" colspan=3|Total rejected ballots
!align="right"|717
!align="right"|
!align="right"|
|- bgcolor="white"
!align="right" colspan=3|Turnout
!align="right"|77.94%
!align="right"|
!align="right"|
|- bgcolor="white"
!align="right" colspan=9|6Preferential ballot: 1st and 4th counts of four shown only) 	
|}

|-

 
|Liberal
|Robert George McPhee
|align="right"|2,339
|align="right"|19.81%
|align="right"|
|align="right"|unknown
 
|Co-operative Commonwealth Fed.
|Cyril Newman
|align="right"|4,555
|align="right"|38.57%
|align="right"|
|align="right"|unknown
|- bgcolor="white"
!align="right" colspan=3|Total valid votes
!align="right"|11,810
!align="right"|100.00%
!align="right"|
|- bgcolor="white"
!align="right" colspan=3|Total valid votes
!align="right"|11,810
!align="right"|100.00%
!align="right"|
|- bgcolor="white"
!align="right" colspan=3|Total rejected ballots
!align="right"|183
!align="right"|
!align="right"|
|- bgcolor="white"
!align="right" colspan=3|Turnout
!align="right"|%
!align="right"|
!align="right"|
|}

|-
 
|Liberal
|William Wallace Baikie
|align="right"|2,759
|align="right"|17.47%
|align="right"|
|align="right"|unknown

 
|Progressive Conservative
|Alan Gray
|align="right"|653
|align="right"|4.14%
|align="right"|
|align="right"|unknown

 
|Co-operative Commonwealth Fed.
|Frederick Charles Wood
|align="right"|6,072
|align="right"|38.45%
|align="right"|
|align="right"|unknown
|- bgcolor="white"
!align="right" colspan=3|Total valid votes
!align="right"|15,791 
!align="right"|100.00%
!align="right"|
|- bgcolor="white"
!align="right" colspan=3|Total rejected ballots
!align="right"|248
!align="right"|
!align="right"|
|- bgcolor="white"
!align="right" colspan=3|Turnout
!align="right"|%
!align="right"|
!align="right"|
|}

|-

 
|Liberal
|David Alexander Elrix
|align="right"|1,259
|align="right"|8.09%
|align="right"|
|align="right"|unknown
 
|Progressive Conservative
|Duncan McIntyre Fraser
|align="right"|1,475
|align="right"|9.47%
|align="right"|
|align="right"|unknown

|- bgcolor="white"
!align="right" colspan=3|Total valid votes
!align="right"|15,570 
!align="right"|100.00%
!align="right"|
|- bgcolor="white"
!align="right" colspan=3|Total rejected ballots
!align="right"|150
!align="right"|
!align="right"|
|- bgcolor="white"
!align="right" colspan=3|Turnout
!align="right"|%
!align="right"|
!align="right"|
|}

|-

 
|Liberal
|Joseph J. Cvetkovich
|align="right"|1,276
|align="right"|11.57%
|align="right"|
|align="right"|unknown

|- bgcolor="white"
!align="right" colspan=3|Total valid votes
!align="right"|11,033
!align="right"|100.00%
!align="right"|
|- bgcolor="white"
!align="right" colspan=3|Total rejected ballots
!align="right"|104
!align="right"|
!align="right"|
|- bgcolor="white"
!align="right" colspan=3|Turnout
!align="right"|%
!align="right"|
!align="right"|
|}

|-

 
|Liberal
|Olga Ruth Henrietta Chown
|align="right"|2,303
|align="right"|13.28%
|align="right"|
|align="right"|unknown

|- bgcolor="white"
!align="right" colspan=3|Total valid votes
!align="right"|17,344 
!align="right"|100.00%
!align="right"|
|- bgcolor="white"
!align="right" colspan=3|Total rejected ballots
!align="right"|194
!align="right"|
!align="right"|
|- bgcolor="white"
!align="right" colspan=3|Turnout
!align="right"|%
!align="right"|
!align="right"|
|}

|-

 
|Progressive Conservative
|Lawrence Foort
|align="right"|1,166
|align="right"|5.30%
|align="right"|
|align="right"|unknown

 
|Liberal
|Patrick Melvin Thompson
|align="right"|1,903
|align="right"|8.66%
|align="right"|
|align="right"|unknown
|- bgcolor="white"
!align="right" colspan=3|Total valid votes
!align="right"|21,985
!align="right"|100.00%
!align="right"|
|- bgcolor="white"
!align="right" colspan=3|Total rejected ballots
!align="right"|135
!align="right"|
!align="right"|
|- bgcolor="white"
!align="right" colspan=3|Turnout
!align="right"|%
!align="right"|
!align="right"|
|}

|-

 
|Liberal
|Norman L. McLaren
|align="right"|1,381
|align="right"|5.28%
|align="right"|
|align="right"|unknown

 
|Progressive Conservative
|Victor Albert Stephens
|align="right"|3,906
|align="right"|15.09%
|align="right"|
|align="right"|unknown
|- bgcolor="white"
!align="right" colspan=3|Total valid votes
!align="right"|26,148
!align="right"|100.00%
!align="right"|
|- bgcolor="white"
!align="right" colspan=3|Total rejected ballots
!align="right"|454
!align="right"|
!align="right"|
|- bgcolor="white"
!align="right" colspan=3|Turnout
!align="right"|%
!align="right"|
!align="right"|
|}

|-

 
|Progressive Conservative
|Eric Harry Kellow
|align="right"|2,251
|align="right"|10.20%
|align="right"|
|align="right"|unknown

|- bgcolor="white"
!align="right" colspan=3|Total valid votes
!align="right"|22,061 
!align="right"|100.00%
!align="right"|
|- bgcolor="white"
!align="right" colspan=3|Total rejected ballots
!align="right"|315
!align="right"|
!align="right"|
|- bgcolor="white"
!align="right" colspan=3|Turnout
!align="right"|%
!align="right"|
!align="right"|
|}

|-
 
|Liberal
|Thomas John Finnie
|align="right"|502
|align="right"|1.71%
|align="right"|
|align="right"|unknown

|Independent
|Victor Albert Stephens
|align="right"|705
|align="right"|2.39%
|align="right"|
|align="right"|unknown
|- bgcolor="white"
!align="right" colspan=3|Total valid votes
!align="right"|29,452
!align="right"|100.00%
!align="right"|
|- bgcolor="white"
!align="right" colspan=3|Total rejected ballots
!align="right"|258
!align="right"|
!align="right"|
|- bgcolor="white"
!align="right" colspan=3|Turnout
!align="right"|%
!align="right"|
!align="right"|
|}

 
|Liberal
|John G. (Jack) Setter
|align="right"|985
|align="right"|3.18%
|align="right"|
|align="right"|unknown
 
|Progressive Conservative
|Terry Ian
|align="right"|573
|align="right"|1.85%
|align="right"|
|align="right"|unknown
|- bgcolor="white"
!align="right" colspan=3|Total valid votes
!align="right"|30,953
!align="right"|100.00%
!align="right"|
|- bgcolor="white"
!align="right" colspan=3|Total rejected ballots
!align="right"|276
!align="right"|
!align="right"|
|- bgcolor="white"
!align="right" colspan=3|Turnout
!align="right"|%
!align="right"|
!align="right"|
|}

Sources 

Elections BC historical returns

Former provincial electoral districts of British Columbia